Born to Be Free may refer to:

 Born to Be Free (Sonique album), 2003
 Born to Be Free (Borko album), 2012
 "Born to Be Free" (X Japan song), 2015